This is a lists of flags used in the Dominican Republic. For more information about the national flag, visit the article Flag of the Dominican Republic.

National flags

Standards

Military

Land Force

Navy

Air Force

Police

Institutional flags

Political flags

Historical flags

See also
 Provinces of the Dominican Republic

References

External links

 Dominican Republic, at Flags of the World

Flags
Lists and galleries of flags
Flags